Keith Tellus Browner, Sr. (born January 24, 1962) is a former American football defensive end and outside linebacker. He is the father of Keith Browner, Jr. who was a linebacker for the Cal Golden Bears and played defensive end for the Houston Texans.

College career
Browner was drafted out of the University of Southern California with the 30th pick in the second round.

Professional career
He played in the National Football League between 1984 and 1988 for Tampa Bay Buccaneers, the Los Angeles Raiders, the San Francisco 49ers and the San Diego Chargers and in Arena Football between 1990 and 1997.

Personal
His eldest brother, Ross Browner, was inducted into the College Football Hall of Fame in 1999 and an NFL star. Two other brothers, Jimmy and Willard Browner were college standouts at Notre Dame. Another brother, Joey Browner, also played with Keith for the USC Trojans and was one of the top players in the NFL in the 1980s. Keith's son, Keith Browner Jr., a defensive end/linebacker played college football for the University of California, Berkeley, and NFL teams, Houston Texans and Chicago Bears. Keith's eldest daughter, Keicha Browner, was a national synchronized swimmer and standout athlete in multiple sports in high school. His twin daughters are Amber Browner and Ashley Browner were both basketball players for San Diego City College. Keith's nephew, Rylan Browner (son of Ross Browner), played football for the University of Arizona and Max Starks is a 2x Superbowl Champion that played with the Pittsburgh Steelers.

References

1962 births
Living people
Tampa Bay Buccaneers players
Los Angeles Raiders players
San Francisco 49ers players
San Diego Chargers players
Pittsburgh Gladiators players
Tampa Bay Storm players
Charlotte Rage players
Arizona Rattlers players
USC Trojans football players
American football linebackers
Sportspeople from Warren, Ohio
Players of American football from Ohio
American football defensive ends
National Football League replacement players